FC Linköping City is a Swedish professional football club based in Linköping, affiliated with the Östergötlands Fotbollförbund. They currently play in Swedish Football Division 1 after winning Swedish Football Division 3 with 22 points ahead of second placed team their first season in 2013, and finishing in ninth place in 2014 Swedish Football Division 2.

The club was founded around New Years Day of 2013, replacing FK Linköping in the Swedish football league system for the 2013 season.

Background 

The club was founded in a merger between FK Linköping and FC Syrianska, with the goal to get football in Linköping to a higher level. When FC Linköping City was created, it took the place of FK Linköping in the Swedish football league system.  The club started playing in Division 3 Nordöstra Götaland, which is the fifth tier of Swedish football. They started playing their home matches at Folkungavallen in Linköping, before moving to the new Linköping Arena in autumn 2013.  FC Linköping City are affiliated with the Östergötlands Fotbollförbund.

Rivalries 
Several clubs play in Linköping, however, the biggest rivalry to FC Linköping City is AFK Linköping, a club that was founded in the winter between the 2012 and 2013 seasons. The difference in team make-up is that FC Linköping City built their team with players from higher leagues while AFK Linköping used more local talent. The first game played between these rivals was played away on 19 June 2013; a game where FC Linköping City won 2–0. The return game in the league was played at home on 4 August 2013 in the new arena Linköping Arena and FC Linköping City won 2–0.

Seasons

2013 

In 2013, FC Linköping City immediately put up the goal to win Division 3 and get promoted to Division 2. The start of the season started out promising, and the club had seven consecutive wins before drawing 3–3 away against Linghems SK.  This seven game winning streak is even more remarkable because only two out of seven games were at home. When Division 3 reached its summer break, the club had a five-point lead with a 9 wins, 1 draw, 1 loss record, and nine games left at home and only two games left away. The second part of the season was even more impressing when they won all remaining eleven matches and saw the lead grow to the final 22 points ahead of second placed team, IF Haga. This meant promotion to Division 2 (tier 4 of Swedish football) and a good start for the newly built club.

2014 

Before the season started, FC Linköping City announced a change of head coach. The new coach, Andreas Thomsson, comes from Öster IF in Allsvenskan (tier 1 in Swedish football), and has merits from football on the highest level in Sweden.

Season summary

Current squad

References

External links 
  
  FC Linköping City – FC Linköping City at the official site for Swedish Football Association 
 FC Linköping City – FC Linköping City on Facebook 
 FC Linköping City – FC Linköping City on svenska fans 

Football clubs in Östergötland County
Association football clubs established in 2013
2013 establishments in Sweden